Ovidio Cátulo González Castillo (6 August 1906 – 19 October 1975) was an Argentine poet and tango music composer. The tango La calesita, which he composed with Mariano Mores, inspired the film of the same name directed in 1962 by Hugo del Carril.

His father, José González Castillo, an anarchist, wanted to list himself in the civil registry as Descanso Dominical González Castillo, but was convinced by his friends not to, and kept his other name. As an infant, Cátulo lived in Chile, where his father was exiled because of his anarchist ideology. He returned to Argentina in 1913. Cátulo later affiliated with the Communist Party.

Professional career

Cátulo composed Organito de la tarde, his first tango, at the age of 17. He was also a boxer, eventually becoming the featherweight champion in Argentina and was pre-selected for the Paris Olympics, attending as part of his country's delegation, but not competing.

In 1926, he traveled to Europe, where he would later conduct his own orchestra.

During the 1930s, he obtained one of the cathedras of the Municipal Conservatory of Manuel de Falla in Buenos Aires. In 1950, he would become the director of that conservatory, where he remained until he retired.

During the 1940s and 1950s, when tango was at its peak, he dedicated himself to poetry and wrote with distinguished composers: Mores (Patio de la Morocha),  (Anoche), Pugliese (Una vez), Sebastián Piana (Tinta roja and Caserón de tejas), and his main collaborator after 1945: Aníbal Troilo (María, La última curda, Una canción).

He wrote for many journals, published the book Danzas Argentinas in 1953, composed songs for different films, wrote the lyrical sainete El Patio de la Morocha (with music by Troilo), and was both secretary and president of SADAIC in different years.

In 1953, he became president of the National Commission of Culture of the Nation. Two years later, the military government, the so-called Revolución Libertadora, stripped him of everything he had achieved. His wife, Amanda Pelufo, recalls those times:

Because of persecution by Pedro Eugenio Aramburu's government, he had to abandon his profession. Included on blacklists with dozens of other tangueros like Hugo de Carril, Nelly Omar, Anita Palmero, and Chola Luna, among others, he was persecuted for his political ideas, and did not return to work until the regime's fall.

With the political thaw in the 1960s, Cátulo returned to his former activity. He continued composing, writing radical screenplays, and working in SADAIC. He published the novel Amalio Reyes, un hombre, which became a film directed by Hugo del Carril. He also published Prostibulario, on his correspondence with Perón, in 1971. Among his most popular songs were: Maria, El último café, La última curda, La Calesita, Café de los Angelitos, Desencuentro, Y a mi qué, A Homero, Arrabalera, Mensaje, Tinta roja, Patio mío, and Caserón de tejas.

In 1974, he was named Illustrious Citizen of Buenos Aires. Upon receiving the award, he told a short fable:

Death
He died 19 October 1975 from a heart attack.

Filmography

Author
 El patio de la morocha  (1951)
 La calesita  (1963)
 Amalio Reyes, un hombre  (1970)
   (1999)

Music
 Internado  (1935)
 Juan Moreira  (1936)
   (1940)
 Arrabalera  (1950)

Soundtracks
 Ayúdame a vivir  (1936)
 Eclipse de sol  (1942)
 Buenos Aires a la vista  (1950)
 Vivir un instante  (1951)
 La muerte flota en el río  (1956)
   (1989)

Texts
 Ésta es mi Argentina  (1974)

References

Bibliography

External links

 Cátulo Castillo, Todo Tango
 Información sobre Cátulo Castillo on the Argentine national film website

1906 births
1975 deaths
Writers from Buenos Aires
Argentine male poets
20th-century Argentine poets
20th-century Argentine male writers
Burials at La Chacarita Cemetery
20th-century composers
Argentine composers
Illustrious Citizens of Buenos Aires
Boxers from Buenos Aires
Argentine male boxers
Featherweight boxers